In Greek mythology, Nausithoe (Ancient Greek: Ναυσιθόη means 'swift ships') was the Nereid of swift ships and one of the 50 marine-nymph daughters of the 'Old Man of the Sea' Nereus and the Oceanid Doris.

Notes

References 

 Apollodorus, The Library with an English Translation by Sir James George Frazer, F.B.A., F.R.S. in 2 Volumes, Cambridge, MA, Harvard University Press; London, William Heinemann Ltd. 1921. . Online version at the Perseus Digital Library. Greek text available from the same website.

Nereids